Flamierge is a village of Wallonia and a district of the municipality of Bertogne, located in the province of Luxembourg, belgium.

During the Battle of the Bulge of World War II, elements of the US 17th Airborne Division were engaged in fighting around Flamierge in January 1945.

References

External links

Former municipalities of Luxembourg (Belgium)